Arrhenia eburnea is a species of agaric fungus in the family Hygrophoraceae. Found in Spain, it was described as new to science in 2003. It has white to ivory-colored fruit bodies with decurrent gills, and a smooth stipe. Its spores are smooth, hyaline, ellipsoid to somewhat cylindrical, and measure 9–11.5 by 4.5–6.5 μm. The specific epithet eburnea, derived from the Latin eburneus, refers to the yellowish-white hues of the fruit bodies.

References

External links

Fungi described in 2003
Fungi of Europe
Hygrophoraceae